Pralhad Niraji popularly known as Pralhad Pant, was the Pant Pratinidhi of the Maratha Empire during the reign of Chatrapathi Rajaram I. He was the first occupant of the position of Pant Pratinidhi.He is remembered for his splendid contribution in strengthening the Maratha Empire by way of loyalty, diplomacy and exceptional sacrifice.

Early life
Pralhad Niraji was  the son of the Nyayadish Niraji Raoji.

Career
After the death of the Chatrapathi Sambhaji the Ashta Pradhan mandal fell to pieces. During these critical days of the Maratha kingdom under Rajaram it was Pralhad Niraji, who came to the front and exercised considerable influence in Maratha politics. But the most influential man at that time was Ramchandra Pant Amatya, whose father Abbaji sondev had been shivaji's military commander.

References

Bibliography
 
 
 

Marathi people